The Ohrid dialect (Ohridski dijalekt) is a member of the western and north western subgroup of the western group of dialects of the Macedonian language. The dialect is spoken in the region around the city Ohrid, North Macedonia up to the southern point of the Ohrid Lake. Except in the city of Ohrid, the dialect is spoken in the villages Trpejca, Peštani, Elešec, Velgoshti and many others smaller villages in that area. This dialect is known among the Macedonians as a dialect of extensive use of the suffix -t and to some extent shortening of the words. The Ohrid dialect is also part of the Macedonian literature, especially with the works of Grigor Prličev with his Biography, Skenderbeg and Serdarot. The Ohrid dialect is closely related with the nearby city Struga and Upper Prespa dialects.

Phonological characteristics

shortening of words: братучед / bratučed → брачед / bračed ('cousin');
absence of intervocalic ;
use of the consonant groups št and žd;
use of the cu- instead of the consonant group cv-: цвет / cvet → цут / cut ('flower').

Morphological characteristics
use of the suffix -t for third-person singular;
use of the preposition vo, v;
loss of the suffix -m in first-person singular;
use of dative forms;

Examples of the dialect

"...Da vi kaža i drugo: Opisanata vo Armatolos  Neda ne e druga ocvan majka, i nejzinoto snovidenie - majčino mi snovidenie. Tolku e verno oti majčinata ljubov pomaga i vo spisanijata..." - Autobiography by Grigor Prličev

References

Dialects of the Macedonian language
Ohrid
Ohrid Municipality